The Well-Tempered Critic: One man's view of the theatre and letters in Canada is a collection of essays by Canadian novelist and journalist Robertson Davies. The collection was edited by Judith Skelton Grant and published by McClelland and Stewart in 1981.

The collection deals with Canadian literature and theatre.

References
Davies, Robertson. The Well-Tempered Critic: One man's view of the theatre and letters in Canada; ed. by Judith Skelton Grant, Toronto: McClelland and Stewart, 1981.  

1981 non-fiction books
Books by Robertson Davies
Books by Judith Skelton Grant
McClelland & Stewart books
Canadian essay collections
Books about literature